Drammen Travbane was a harness racing track located in Drammen, Norway. Owned by Norwegian Trotting Association, its tote betting is handled by Norsk Rikstoto. The venue opened in 1955 and closed in 2019.

References

External links
 Official website 

Sports venues in Drammen
Harness racing venues in Norway
Sports venues completed in 1955
1955 establishments in Norway